The Reformist Democratic Party (Partito Democratico Riformista, PDR) was a reformist and social democratic political party in Italy.

It was formed for the 1921 general election where gained 1.8% of the vote and 11 seats in the Chamber of Deputies. It was disbanded after few years in 1924.

Electoral results

References

Defunct political parties in Italy
Defunct social democratic parties in Italy